The Schlesinger Institute for Medical-Halachic Research was founded in Israel in 1966 under the auspices of Shaare Zedek Medical Center. It is named after the hospital's second director-general. The institute is dedicated to the halachic (Jewish law) approach to medical ethics, and has the purpose of researching and resolving the halachic issues that emerge as medicine progresses, to consider their medical, halachic, legal and ethical ramifications, and to present practical responses.  Leading rabbis, physicians and others, consider and respond to issues, with the intention of following the spirit of Torah.

Principal activities
The Schlesinger Institute offers religious and academic programs in Jewish medical ethics involving prominent Jewish medical ethicists to diverse audiences and student groups. Among these programs are a thirty-hour semester course at the Hebrew University-Hadassah Medical School, summer and winter seminars for medical and nursing students from abroad, lectures and tours of Shaare Zedek for yeshiva and seminary students, and one-day seminars on selected topics for Israeli high school pupils.

Publications
A number of books and journals on Jewish medical ethics are available through the Schlesinger Institute.

Journals
The Schlesinger Institute publishes two journals, ASSIA in Hebrew and JME in English. Both journals covermedical and ethical problems, solutions and ethical thought processes of rabbis and doctors who have dealt with these problems.

Articles published in the journals deal with a variety of topics, including: scientific, legal, ethical and halachic aspects of cloning, determining time of death, heart transplantation, truth-telling to the dangerously ill patient, halachic and medical aspects of the AIDS virus, psychiatry and halacha, the selling of organs, the cessation of medical treatment and euthanasia, initial counseling for a juvenile with homosexual urges, smoking and life expectancy, coercive medical treatment, the surrogate mother, medical dilemmas of hospital nurses and halachic principles connected to the obligation to save human life.

Encyclopedia of Jewish Medical Ethics
By Avraham Steinberg, M.D.

The Encyclopedia of Jewish Medical Ethics covers topics in medical practice from the point of view of halacha and Jewish thought, covering sources from scripture through the whole of ancient, medieval, and modern rabbinic literature. Systematic surveys of related medical, scientific, philosophical, ethical, and legal material, with thousands of references.

Articles in the Encyclopedia cover a wide range of topics both for the medical professional and the patient. It combines halachic principles and medical knowledge, with full references for both. It includes medical, scientific, philosophical, ethical, and legal material, from scripture and Talmud through to the most recent sources.

The articles include: Paternity, Suicide, Autonomy and Free Will, Hospitals, Genetics, Religion and Science, Consent, Abortions, IVF, Organ Transplantation, Conflict of Halacha and Science, Old Age, The Patient, Embalming, Malpractice, Pain, Kashrut and Shabbat, Birth, Medical Education, Human Sexuality, Limited Resources, Medical Experimentation on Humans, Surgery, Confidentiality, Fertility, Lifesaving, Causing Pain to Animals, Triage, Defining Death, Physicians, and General and Jewish Ethics.

Nishmat Abraham
By A.S. Abraham, M.D., F.R.C.P

Published as four-volume set, the Nishmat Avraham on Medical Halacha consists of new responsa and new medical halachic rulings. The Nishmat Abraham is a commentary on the four sections of the Shulchan Aruch with detailed references from the Talmud through Rishonim and Acharonim. It covers thousands of rulings from halachic literature, including  up-to-date material from contemporary authorities all over the world such as Rav M. Feinstein, Rav Sh.Z. Auerbach, Rav Waldenberg, Rav Eliashiv, Rav Ovadia Yosef, Rav Wosner and Rav Neuwirth.

Problems are covered as far-ranging as the doctor and patient on weekdays and Shabbat, Yom Kippur and Pesach, in the hospital or at home, hospice, end of life and brain death, pregnancy and assisted reproduction, contraception and abortion, brit milah and the medical problems of niddah, medical malpractice and claims, genetic engineering and cloning, DNA and stem cells, AIDS and herpes, the threatened doctor and the psychiatric patient, Hatzalah and preventive medicine and their attendant problems in halacha.
The views of leading authorities are comprehensively summarized on each point, covering nearly every issue in medical halacha. It has extensive indices.

Additional books
The institute published other books including:

 Halachot for the Physician and for the patient on the Sabbath and Festivals (English and Hebrew)
 Collections of essays and proceedings from the International Colloquiums on Medicine, Ethics and Jewish Law (English and Hebrew) 
 The Comprehensive Guide to Medical Halacha (English)
 New Horizens in Jewish Medical Ethics (English)
 Establishing the moment of death (Hebrew)
 Medicine and Halacha - practical aspects (Hebrew)

International Responsa Project (IRP)

Questions the Institute receives about medical procedures, ranging from general theoretical inquiries to specific technical ones, are answered by one of the rabbi-doctors at the institute, or, in special cases, by a recognized rabbinical authority.

The Chaim Kahn Library and Information Center
The Library and Information Center is one of the main resource centers for Jewish medical ethics in Israel. All the standard texts of the Jewish library can be found there, as well as compendiums of halacha, medical and Jewish journals, and legal texts. Computer facilities, a database of Jewish sources, and a bibliography of the library are available to the public. The information center is named after Chaim Kahn, the first chairman of the institute.

International conferences
Contributions to the halachic approach to medical or ethical questions are made at the international conferences organized by the Schlesinger Institute. These conferences bring together rabbis, doctors, and others from around the world for lectures by experts on contemporary medical halachic issues. Conference proceedings and background materials have been published in both English and Hebrew.

See also
 Medical Ethics
 Jewish medical ethics

References

External links
 The Schlesinger Institute's homepage
 The Chaim Kahn Library and Information Center
 Responsa Project for Jewish Medical Ethics

Jewish medical ethics
Jewish law
Medical ethics
Medical and health organizations based in Israel
Bioethics